Khunzakhsky District is an administrative and municipal district (raion), one of the forty-one in the Republic of Dagestan, Russia. It is located in the western central part of the republic. Its administrative center is the rural locality (a selo) of Khunzakh. As of the 2010 Census, the total population of the district was 31,691, with the population of Khunzakh accounting for 13.4% of that number.

Administrative and municipal status
Within the framework of administrative divisions, Khunzakhsky District is one of the forty-one in the Republic of Dagestan. The district is divided into fifteen selsoviets which comprise fifty-nine rural localities. As a municipal division, the district is incorporated as Khunzakhsky Municipal District. Its fifteen selsoviets are incorporated as twenty-four rural settlements within the municipal district. The selo of Khunzakh serves as the administrative center of both the administrative and municipal district.

References

Notes

Sources

Districts of Dagestan
